Madeleine Eve Barnett (née Bollinger; born 28 October 1946) is a former Australian diver. She won a bronze medal in the 10 metres highboard event at the 1974 British Commonwealth Games. She also competed at the 1976 Summer Olympics in the 3 metre springboard event where she finished 15th and in the 10 metre platform event where she finished 18th. She is the mother of Olympic bronze medallist diver Steven Barnett.

References

External links

1946 births
Living people
Australian female divers
Commonwealth Games bronze medallists for Australia
Commonwealth Games medallists in diving
Divers at the 1970 British Commonwealth Games
Divers at the 1974 British Commonwealth Games
Divers at the 1976 Summer Olympics
Olympic divers of Australia
20th-century Australian women
21st-century Australian women
Medallists at the 1974 British Commonwealth Games